Stanleyville may refer to:

United States 

 Stanleyville, North Carolina
 Stanleyville, Ohio, an unincorporated community

Elsewhere 

 Stanleyville, Belgian Congo, the former name for Kisangani in the Democratic Republic of the Congo
 Stanleyville, a community in the township of Tay Valley, Ontario, Canada

Film 
 Stanleyville (film), a 2021 Canadian dark comedy film by Maxwell McCabe-Lokos